Wittmann is a German surname. Notable people with the surname include:

August Wittmann (1895–1977), German general during World War II
Dola Ben-Yehuda Wittmann (1902–2005), linguist of Hebrew
Franz Wittmann (physicist) (1869–1932), Hungarian electrician and physicist
Franz Wittmann, Sr. (1950), Austrian rally driver
Franz Wittmann, Jr. (born 1983), Austrian rally driver
Fritz Wittmann (1933–2018), German politician
Heinz-Günter Wittmann (1927–1990), German biochemist
Heinz Wittmann (born 1943), German football player
Henri (Hirsch) Wittmann (born 1937), Quebec linguist
Jürgen Wittmann (born 1966), German football coach 
Krisztián Wittmann (born 1985), Hungarian basketball player
Marshall Wittmann, American pundit, author, and sometime political activist
Michael Wittmann (1914–1944), World War II German tank commander
Walter Wittmann (1948–2020), Austrian chess master
Werner W. Wittmann (born 1944), German psychologist, evaluation researcher and research methodologist

See also 
Wittmann, Arizona, a census-designated place in Arizona, United States
Wittman
Witman, a hamlet in the Netherlands.
Whitman (disambiguation)

Occupational surnames
German-language surnames